The fallacy of accident (also called destroying the exception or a dicto simpliciter ad dictum secundum quid) is an informal fallacy and a deductively valid but unsound argument occurring in a statistical syllogism (an argument based on a generalization) when an exception to a rule of thumb is ignored.  It is one of the thirteen fallacies originally identified by Aristotle in Sophistical Refutations.  The fallacy occurs when one attempts to apply a general rule to an irrelevant situation.

For example:

 

This fallacy may occur when limited generalizations ("some; sometimes and somewhere") are mixed with A-type categorical statements ("all; always and everywhere"), often when no quantifiers like "some" or "many" or qualifiers such as  "rarely" are used to mark off what is or may be excepted in the generalization. 

Related inductive fallacies include overwhelming exceptions and hasty generalizations. See faulty generalization.

The opposing kind of dicto simpliciter fallacy is the converse accident.

Notes

Reference list
 

Relevance fallacies
Syllogistic fallacies